Hœdic or Hoëdic is an island off the south coast of Brittany in northwestern France. Its bigger "twin sister" island is Houat.

Administratively, Hœdic is a commune in the Morbihan department.

Geography 

It is part of a line of granite crests that includes the Le Croisic peninsula, Dumet Island, Houat, Quiberon, and Groix.

The island's base consists essentially of granite and less often of schists. The coast is an alternation of sandy coves and rocky points of variable height, generally more marked to the north (Beg Lagat, the Old Castle) than to the south (Beg Er Faut, Kasperakiz). There are two marshes, one modest, behind the dune of the new harbor, the other about twenty hectares behind the dune of the old port. In addition to the main island, the town has several small islands, including Roc'h Melen, Madavoar, Cardinals, Mulons, and others.

Human geography 

Hœdic has long been associated with familial polyculture of livestock and crops—that is, in farms owned by people and families rather than heavily industrialised farms—along with their fishing resources. The former disappeared in the middle of the 20th century, while the latter had a second wind in the 1980s but is currently declining. Currently, Hœdic is largely dependent on tourism, even more significantly than its neighbour Houat. Similar to Houat, the majority of its land is being invaded by brush.

Hœdic is a car-free island with around 100 inhabitants in the wintertime. During the summer, its population can reach 3,000, including boaters, tourists, and campers coming to the island. The island is connected to the mainland via Compagnie Océane boats year-round and Compagnie des Iles boats during the tourist season (connections from Quiberon).

Demographics 

Inhabitants of Hœdic are called Hœdicais.

See also
Communes of the Morbihan department

References

External links

Islands of Brittany
Communes of Morbihan
Islands of the Bay of Biscay